Xavier Pompidou (born 27 July 1972) is a French racing driver.

In 2009 Xavier drove for Speedy Racing Team Sebah in the European Le Mans Series. The team entered the 24 hours of Le Mans and finished second in class and 12th overall.

References

1972 births
Living people
French racing drivers
24 Hours of Le Mans drivers
People from Meulan-en-Yvelines
Blancpain Endurance Series drivers
European Le Mans Series drivers
FIA GT Championship drivers
American Le Mans Series drivers
Porsche Supercup drivers
French Formula Three Championship drivers
French Formula Renault 2.0 drivers
Formula Renault Eurocup drivers
Karting World Championship drivers
Sportspeople from Yvelines

Rebellion Racing drivers